Mililani Mauka is a census-designated place (CDP) in Honolulu County, Hawaii on the island of Oahu, Hawaii, United States. As of the 2020 census, the CDP had a population of 21,075.

History
Ground was broken for Mililani Mauka on April 6, 1990, east of Interstate H-2 from Mililani Town. The first homeowners moved into Mauka in 1992. The community is the future site of the Oahu Arts Center.

Geography 
Mililani Mauka is located at  (21.4756, -157.9947). Mililani Mauka lies within the Ewa Moku on Oʻahu, more specifically the Waipio Ahupuaʻa.

Demographics

Education
Hawaii Department of Education operates public schools within the CDP.

Mililani Mauka is home to Mililani Mauka Elementary School, Mililani Ike Elementary School, and Mililani Middle School.

References

Census-designated places in Honolulu County, Hawaii
Populated places on Oahu
Populated places established in 1990
1990 establishments in Hawaii